Peel is a civil parish in Carleton County, New Brunswick, Canada, situated on the eastern bank of the Saint John River. It comprises one local service district and part of one town, both of which are members of the Western Valley Regional Service Commission (WVRSC).

The Census subdivision of Peel Parish includes all of the civil parish except the town of Florenceville-Bristol.

Origin of name
The parish may have been named after one of two brothers: Jonathan Peel, Secretary of State for War when the parish was created, or Robert Peel, who was twice Prime Minister of the United Kingdom.

History
Peel was erected in 1859 from northwestern Brighton Parish. It included the southwestern corner of Aberdeen Parish until 1863.

Boundaries
Peel Parish is bounded:

 on the west by the Saint John River;
 on the north by a line running due east from opposite the mouth of Whitemarsh Brook to a reserved road along the western line of grants on the Ketchum Ridge Road, then south along that tier of grants to its end, then due east to the Cold Stream near the junction of Black Brook and East Coldstream roads;
 on the east by the Cold Stream;
 and on the south by the prolongation of the north line of a land grant north of Hales Brook to the Cold Stream.

Municipality
The town of Florenceville-Bristol comprises the northwestern corner of the parish.

Local service district
The local service district of the parish of Peel comprises all of the parish outside Florenceville-Bristol.

The LSD was established in 1966 to assess for fire service following the abolition of county government under the new Municipalities Act. Community services were added in 1967.

Today the LSD assesses for community and recreation services in addition to the basic LSD services of fire protection, police services, land use planning, emergency measures, and dog control. The taxing authority is 211.00 Peel.

LSD advisory committee: Yes. Chair Jill Hunter was an alternate on the WVRSC board in 2015 and 2016. Chair Joseph Trevors has sat on the board since 2017.

Communities
Communities at least partly within the parish; bold indicates an incorporated municipality; italics indicate a name no longer in official use

 East Coldstream
 Florenceville-Bristol
 Jericho
 Lansdowne
 Mount Pleasant
 Oakland
  Peel
 Riverbank
 South Gordonsville
  Stickney
 Upper Peel

Bodies of water
Bodies of water at least partly in the parish:
  Saint John River
 Cold Stream

Islands
Islands at least partly in the parish:
 Presque Isle Island

Other notable places
Parks, historic sites, and other noteworthy places at least partly in the parish.
 Oakland Mountain Protected Natural Area
 Stickney Protected Natural Area

Demographics
Parish population total does not include portion within Florenceville-Bristol

Population
Population trend

Language
Mother tongue (2016)

See also
List of parishes in New Brunswick

Notes

References

Parishes of Carleton County, New Brunswick